Guanine nucleotide-binding protein G(olf) subunit alpha is a protein that in humans is encoded by the GNAL gene.
Its main product is the heterotrimeric G-protein alpha subunit Golf-α, a member of the Gs alpha subunit family that is a key component of G protein-coupled receptor-regulated adenylyl cyclase signal transduction pathways in the olfactory system and the striatum in the brain. It also mediated D1 receptor signalling in the striatum and is hence involved in motor control.

See also
 Second messenger system
 G protein-coupled receptor
 Heterotrimeric G protein
 Adenylyl cyclase
 Protein kinase A
 Olfactory receptors

References

Further reading

Biology of bipolar disorder